Anton Gunther Friedrich Elimar (23 January 1844 – 17 October 1895) was a duke of Oldenburg, and the son of Augustus, Grand Duke of Oldenburg and Princess Cecilia of Sweden.

Family
Anton Gunther Friedrich Elimar was a child of Augustus, Grand Duke of Oldenburg and his third wife, Princess Cecilia of Sweden, daughter of King Gustav IV Adolf of Sweden. His elder half-sister was Amalia of Oldenburg, Queen-consort of Greece.

Elimar was a charming prince and tried his best to please his worried father. His father was determined to keep his living son alive and make his wife Cecilia proud. Elimar was patient but unlike his other half-sister and half-brothers he wanted to have a good education. He went to public academies which made his father concerned. When his father died Elimar felt lonely but continued to take public academies.

Marriage
On 9 November 1876 he married morganatically Baroness Natalie Vogel von Friesenhof in Vienna, Alexandre Pushkin's niece and cousin of Natalia Alexandrovna Pushkina, herself the morganatic wife of Prince Nikolaus Wilhelm of Nassau. Upon marriage, she held the title Countess von Welsburg. The couple had two children:

Countess Alexandrine Gustava Friederike von Welsburg (11 October 1877, Vienna - 13 April 1901, Austria); died unmarried at the age of 23.
Count Gustav Gregor Alexander von Welsburg (29 August 1878, Hungary - 29 November 1927, Switzerland); married Countess Luise von Hahn and fathered three sons and one daughter.

In their former castle in Brodzany (Slovakia) is the now Pushkin's museum.

Honours 
 : Grand Cross of the Order of Duke Peter Friedrich Ludwig, with Golden Crown, 23 January 1844
 :
 Knight of the House Order of Fidelity, 1860
 Grand Cross of the Zähringer Lion, 1860
 : Grand Cross of the Ludwig Order, 7 November 1860
  Kingdom of Prussia:
 Grand Cross of the Red Eagle, 18 October 1861
 Knight's Cross of the Royal House Order of Hohenzollern, with Swords, 20 September 1866
 : Grand Cross of the Royal Guelphic Order, 1862

Ancestors

References

1844 births
1895 deaths
Dukes of Oldenburg
People from Oldenburg (city)
People from Oldenburg (state)
Sons of monarchs